John Joseph Matthews (September 29, 1898 – February 8, 1968) was an American professional baseball player who played in three games for the Boston Braves during the  season.
He was born in Baltimore, Maryland and died in Hagerstown, Maryland at the age of 69.

External links

Major League Baseball pitchers
Baseball players from Baltimore
Boston Braves players
1898 births
1968 deaths